Swissôtel Amsterdam is a four-star luxury hotel in Amsterdam, the capital city of the Netherlands, and is managed by the Switzerland-based hotel chain Swissôtel Hotels & Resorts. Swissotel Amsterdam is located near Dam Square, in the heart of Amsterdam's historic city centre.

History
The hotel was partly built in the 19th and finished in the 20th century. Designed by Hendrik Petrus Berlage who is considered the "Father of Modern Architecture" http://www.mediamatic.net/2121/nl/hendrik-p-berlage ,and takes heavy influence from the Neo-Romanesque brickwork architecture. The hotel officially opened in August 1986. Behind its historical façade of the early centuries, there are 111 guest rooms and suites. In 2011, the interior received a facelift  and in 2013 all rooms underwent a renovation.

Awards
The hotel has won the World Travel Award for "Netherlands Leading Business Hotel" in 2011, 2012, 2013 and 2014.

The hotel has also won the World Travel Award for "Netherlands Leading Boutique Hotel" in 2015 and 2016.

External links

References

Hotels in Amsterdam
Hotels established in 1986